I trollskogen ("In the Troll Forest") was the 1959 edition of Sveriges Radio's Christmas Calendar. For first time, the story was a work of drama/fiction.

Plot
Two children, Birgitta and Jan, go on adventures in a troll-forest. They visit Santa's workshop, meet Mrs. Claus and watch Christmas preparation. Birgitta and Jan return to the workshop every day, hoping to meet Santa Claus. But every time, he's gone on a mission, and the'll not meet him until Christmas Eve.

References
 

1959 radio programme debuts
1959 radio programme endings
Sveriges Radio's Christmas Calendar